Cophura is a genus of robber flies in the family Asilidae. There are at least 50 species described in the genus Cophura.

Species
These 54 species belong to the genus Cophura:

 Cophura acapulcae Pritchard, 1943 c g
 Cophura ameles Pritchard, 1943 i c g
 Cophura apotma Pritchard, 1943 c g
 Cophura arizonensis (Schaeffer, 1916) i c g b
 Cophura atypha Pritchard, 1943 c g
 Cophura bella (Loew, 1872) i c g b
 Cophura brevicornis (Williston, 1883) c g b
 Cophura caca Pritchard, 1943 i c g
 Cophura calla Pritchard, 1943 c g
 Cophura clausa (Coquillett, 1893) i c g
 Cophura cora Pritchard, 1943 c g
 Cophura dammersi Wilcox, 1965 i g
 Cophura daphne Pritchard, 1943 i c g
 Cophura dora Pritchard, 1943 i c g
 Cophura feigei Kaletta, 1983 c g
 Cophura fergusoni Wilcox, 1965 i c g
 Cophura fisheri Wilcox, 1965 i c g
 Cophura flavus Wilcox, 1965 c g
 Cophura fur (Williston, 1885) i c g
 Cophura getzendaneri Wilcox, 1959 i c g
 Cophura hennei Wilcox and Martin, 1945 i c g
 Cophura hesperia (Pritchard, 1935) i c g
 Cophura humilis (Bellardi, 1861) c
 Cophura hurdi Hull, 1960 i c g
 Cophura igualae Pritchard, 1943 c g
 Cophura luteus Wilcox, 1965 c g
 Cophura lutzi Curran, 1931 c g
 Cophura luzti (Curran, 1931) i g
 Cophura melanochaeta Williston, 1924 c g
 Cophura nephressa Pritchard, 1943 c g
 Cophura painteri Pritchard, 1943 i c g b
 Cophura picta Carrera, 1955 c g
 Cophura pollinosa Curran, 1930 i c g b
 Cophura powersi Wilcox, 1965 i c g
 Cophura pulchella Williston, 1901 i c g
 Cophura rozeni Wilcox, 1965 i c g
 Cophura rubidus Wilcox, 1965 c g
 Cophura scitula Williston i c g
 Cophura sculleni Wilcox, 1937 i c g
 Cophura sodalis Osten Sacken, 1887 i c g
 Cophura stylosa Curran, 1931 i c g
 Cophura sundra Pritchard, 1943 c g
 Cophura tanbarki Wilcox, 1965 i c g
 Cophura texana Bromley, 1934 i c g
 Cophura timberlakei Wilcox, 1965 i c g
 Cophura tolandi Wilcox, 1959 i c g b
 Cophura trunca (Coquillett, 1893) i c g
 Cophura vanduzeei Wilcox, 1965 i c g
 Cophura vandykei Wilcox, 1965 i c g b
 Cophura vera (Pritchard, 1935) i c g
 Cophura vitripennis (Curran, 1927) i c g
 Cophura wilcoxi Kaletta, 1983 c g
 Cophura willistoni Pritchard, 1943 c g
 Cophura zandra Pritchard, 1943 c g

Data sources: i = ITIS, c = Catalogue of Life, g = GBIF, b = Bugguide.net

References

Further reading

 
 
 

Asilidae
Articles created by Qbugbot
Asilidae genera